Jessica Phillips (born May 22, 1978 in Aspen, Colorado) is a former professional road cyclist from the United States. She represented her nation at the 2009 UCI Road World Championships in the Women's time trial. She is married to former professional cyclist Tejay van Garderen.

References

External links
 
 

1978 births
Living people
American female cyclists
Sportspeople from Aspen, Colorado
21st-century American women